Anicla tepperi is a moth of the family Noctuidae first described by Smith in 1888. It is found in North America from eastern Manitoba west to the Alberta foothills, north to about Lloydminster and south to southern Colorado.

The wingspan is 36–40 mm. Adults are on wing from June to July depending on the location. There is one generation per year.

The larvae feed on grasses of the family Poaceae.

References

"Anicla tepperi (Smith 1888)". Moths of North Dakota. Retrieved November 15, 2020.

Noctuinae
Moths of North America
Moths described in 1888